Wat or wot or tsebhi is an Ethiopian and Eritrean stew that may be prepared with chicken, beef, lamb, a variety of vegetables, spice mixtures such as berbere, and niter kibbeh, a seasoned clarified butter.

Overview

Several properties distinguish wats from stews of other cultures. Perhaps the most obvious is an unusual cooking technique: the preparation of a wat begins with chopped onions slow cooked, without any fat or oil, in a dry skillet or pot until much of their moisture has been driven away. Fat (usually niter kibbeh) is then added, and the onions and other aromatics are sautéed before the addition of other ingredients. This method causes the onions to break down and thicken the stew.

Wat is traditionally eaten with injera, a spongy flat bread made from the millet-like grain known as teff.   There are many types of wats. The popular ones are doro wat and siga wat, (Amharic: ሥጋ śigā) made with beef.

Doro  wat 
Doro wat ( dōrō we̠t’,   Tsebhi derhō ), made from chicken and sometimes hard-boiled eggs is the most popular traditional food in Eritrea and Ethiopia, often eaten as part of a group who share a communal bowl and basket of injera.

Misir wat 

Misir wat is a lentil stew; its key ingredients include split red lentils, garlic, onions, and spices. It is a popular vegan dish, and in high demand during fasting periods for Orthodox Christians.

Sanbat wat
A Jewish version of doro wat is eaten by the Beta Israel (Ethiopian Jews) called "sanbat wat" (Sabbath wat). Sanbat wat is a traditional Shabbat dish. In order to avoid mixing of meat and dairy, vegetable oil can be used as a pareve substitute in lieu of ghee. Yeqimem zeyet, a form of niter kibbeh made from vegetable oil, can also be used.

See also
 Kai wat
 List of African dishes
 List of Ethiopian dishes and foods
 List of stews

References

Tsebhi
Ethiopian cuisine
National dishes
Stews